Inayatullah Khan was the King of Afghanistan.

Inayatullah Khan may also refer to:

Inayatullah Khan (Indian politician)
Inayatullah Khan (Pakistani politician)